Carolina Hall is a historic residence in Mobile, Alabama, United States.  It was built in 1832 in a Federal style and later altered to a Greek Revival style.  It was placed on the National Register of Historic Places on January 18, 1973.

References

National Register of Historic Places in Mobile, Alabama
Houses on the National Register of Historic Places in Alabama
Houses in Mobile, Alabama
Houses completed in 1832
Federal architecture in Alabama
Greek Revival houses in Alabama